The discography of The Stooges—a Detroit, Michigan based rock band founded by "The Godfather of Punk Music" Iggy Pop as singer, Ron Asheton as guitarist, Dave Alexander as bass-guitarist and Scott Asheton as drummer—currently consists of five studio albums, twenty-four singles, four live albums, and three box sets.

The Stooges debut album The Stooges was released on August 5, 1969 in the United States, and one month later in the United Kingdom. The album was not a huge commercial success—it charted on the Billboard 200 at 106. Almost one year later, on July 7, 1970, the band released their second album, Fun House, which did not chart on the Billboard 200, the UK Albums Chart, or any other international music album chart. In February 1973, the Stooges released their third album, Raw Power. It charted in the Billboard 200 at 182, in the UK at least at 44, and is the best charting album by the Stooges in the United Kingdom to date. After the release of Raw Power, the band (also known at the time as Iggy & The Stooges) announced their break-up. The Stooges reunited thirty-four years after their official dissolution, and released The Weirdness. Although the album was their second-best charting album in the United States, peaking at number 130, its overall commercial success is similar to that of the Stooges' first three albums.

The Stooges are described by critics as one of the key bands of punk music, in the genre described as "proto-punk", an early form of punk rock. Many musicians, particularly those in punk bands, cite the Stooges as a huge influence.

Studio albums

EPs

Live albums

Compilations 

|-
|2017
| Music from the Film Gimme Danger
 Label: Rhino
 Notes: Soundtrack to the Documentary Film.

Box sets 

| 2020
| You Think You're Bad, Man? - The Road Tapes 1973/74
 Label: Cherry Red
 5 concerts including the full Metallic K.O final Show.

Other appearances

Studio 

 "You Better Run" from Sunday Nights: The Songs of Junior Kimbrough by various artists 2005 (US) Fat Possum

Guest appearances 

 Skull Ring by Iggy Pop November 4, 2003 (US)November 2003 (UK) Virgin Records

Singles 
 "I Wanna Be Your Dog" mono version b/w "I Wanna Be Your Dog" stereo version (Elektra, 1969), for promotional use only
 "I Wanna Be Your Dog" b/w "1969" (Elektra, 1969), US
 "1969" b/w "Real Cool Time" (Elektra, 1969)), France
 "I Wanna Be Your Dog" b/w "Ann" (Vedette, 1969), Italy
 "Down on the Street" b/w "1970", (Elektra, 1970), US, France and Japan
 "Search and Destroy" mono version b/w "Search and Destroy" stereo version (Sony, 1973), for promotional use only
 "Shake Appeal" b/w "Search and Destroy" (Sony, 1973), both in playback versions coming with Jesse Ed Davis' tracks "She's A Pain" b/w "Keep Me Coming"
 "Raw Power" b/w "Search and Destroy" (Sony, 1973), Japan
 "I Got a Right" b/w "Gimme Some Skin" (Siamese, 1977), US
 "I'm Sick of You" b/w "Tight Pants" b/w "Scene of the Crime" (Bomp!, 1977), US
 "Johanna" b/w "Purple Haze" (Revenge, 1988), France
 "My Girl Hates My Heroin" b/w "How It Hurts" (Revenge, 1989), France
 "She Creatures of Hollywood Hills" b/w "Untitled Scratch 5", a version of "Till the End of the Night", (sold with the paper "Spiral Scratch", 1989), UK
 "T.V. Eye" (Live version) b/w "What You Gonna Do?" (Revenge, 1990), France
 "Till the End of the Night" b/w "I'm Sick of You" (Revenge, 1990), France
 "She Creatures of Hollywood Hills" b/w "Tight Pants" b/w "Jesus Loves the Stooges" (Revenge, 1990), France
 "Open Up and Bleed" (Studio version) b/w "I Got a Right" b/w "Gimme Some Skin" (Revenge, 1990), France
 "Nowhere" (a version of "Born in a Trailer") b/w "Consolation Prizes" b/w "Johanna" (Revenge, 1990), France
 "I'm Sick of You" b/w "Tight Pants" b/w "She Creatures of Hollywood Hills" (Melodia, Soviet Union), 1990
 "I Got a Right" b/w "Gimme Some Skin" (Bomp!, 1990), US
 "I Got Nothing" b/w "Cock in My Pocket" (Jungle, 1998), UK
 "Gimme Danger" b/w "Heavy Liquid" (Munster, 1999), Spain
 "Search and Destroy" b/w "Penetration" (Sundazed reissue, 2005)
 "Free & Freaky" (Virgin, 2007)

References

External links 
 The Stooges discography on Myspace
 

Discography
Discographies of American artists
Stooges, The